Astram may refer to:

Astram Line, rubber-tired transit system in Hiroshima, Japan
Astram (film), 2006 Telugu film